John Bruno may refer to:

John Bruno (special effects), American visual effects artist and filmmaker
John Bruno (American football) (1964–1992), American football punter

See also
 J. Jon Bruno (1946–2021), American bishop